CMS Dolphin Ltd v Simonet [2001] EWHC Ch 415 is a UK company law case concerning directors' duties.

Facts
Mr Simonet resigned from his position as managing director of CMS Dolphin Ltd (a small advertising company on Charing Cross Road) and he set up a new company. CMS's staff followed and so did the major clients. CMS sued Mr Simonet for the profits he made, alleging that he had breached his duty of loyalty to the company. Mr Simonet contended that he owed no duty because he had left the company.

Judgment
Lawrence Collins J held that Mr Simonet resigned without giving proper notice, and so he was in breach of contract. He had made no proper disclosure and had misused confidential information. The maturing business opportunities were the company's property, ‘where he knowingly had a conflict of interest, and exploited it by resigning from the company’. Resignation was not a fiduciary power in itself, and no obligations continued after the end of the relationship.

See also
UK company law

Notes

References

United Kingdom company case law
High Court of Justice cases
2001 in case law
2001 in British law